This is a list of compositions of Sergei Bortkiewicz.

Piano

Piano Solo
 4 Pieces, Op. 3
 No. 1, Capriccio
 No. 2, Etude
 No. 3, Gavotte-Caprice
 No. 4, "Primula Veris"
Impressions, 7 pieces, Op. 4
 No. 1, Vieux Portrait (Old Picture)
 No. 2, Etude d'oiseaux (Bird's Study)
 No. 3, Tempete (Storm)
 No. 4, Apres la Pluie (After the Rain)
 No. 5, Bergers et Bergères (Shepherds and Shepherdesses)
 No. 6, Au Clair de la Lune (By Moonlight)
 No. 7, Bal masqué (Fancy Dress Ball)
Minuit, 2 pieces, Op. 5
Trois Morceaux, Op. 6
 No. 1, Prelude
 No. 2, Valse Triste
 No. 3, Etude
 2 Pieces, Op. 7
 No. 1, Mélodie
 No. 2, Menuet-fantasie
Esquisses de Crimée, 4 pieces, Op. 8
 No. 1, Les Rochers d'Outche-Coche
 No. 2, Caprices de la Mer
 No. 3, Idylle Orientale
 No. 4, Chaos
Piano Sonata No. 1 in B major, Op. 9
Vier Klavierstücke, Op. 10
Six pensées lyriques, Op. 11
Trois Morceaux, Op. 12
6 Preludes, Op. 13
Aus meiner Kindheit (From My Childhood), 6 pieces, Op. 14
 No. 1, Was die Amme sang (What the Nurse Sang)
 No. 2 Das dunkle Zimmer (The Dark Room)
 No. 3, Die Tanzstunde (The Dancing Lesson)
 No. 4, Erste Liebe (First Love)
 No. 5, Erster Schmerz (First Sorrow)
 No. 6, Wenn ich erst groß bin (When I am a Man)
10 Etudes, Op. 15
Lamentations and Consolations, 8 pieces, Op. 17
Der Kleine Wanderer (The Little Wanderer), 13 pieces, Op. 21
 No. 1, Der Kleine Wanderer (The Little Wanderer)
 No. 2, Im Schlitten (The Sleigh Drive)
 No. 3, Das Lebewohl (The Farewell)
 No. 4, Abfahrt des Zuges (The Train's Departure)
 No. 5, Durch die Steppe (Through the Steps)
 No. 6, In Polen (In Poland)
 No. 7, Venedig, Gondellied (Venice, Song of the Gondelier)
 No. 8, Neapel, Volkslied (Naples, Canzone)
 No. 9, Frankreich, Volkslied (France, Folksong)
 No. 10, Spanien, Serenade (Spain)
 No. 11, England, Schottischer Tanz (England, Scottish Dance)
 No. 12, Alt-Deutschland (Old Germany)
 No. 13, Norwegen (Norway)
 3 Pieces, Op. 24
 No. 1, Nocturne (Diana)
 No. 2, Valse Grotesque (Satyre)
 No. 3, Impromptu (Eros)
3 Waltzes, Op. 27
 No. 1, La Gracieuse
 No. 2, La Melancolique
 No. 3, La Viennoise
 12 Etudes Nouvelles, Op. 29
 No. 1, La blonde (G major)
 No. 2, La rousse (E major)
 No. 3, La brune (C♯ minor)
 No. 4, Le philosophe (C♯ minor)
 No. 5, Le poète, pour la main gauche seule (F♯ major)
 No. 6, Le héros (E♭ major)
 No. 7, Le mystérieux inconnu (G minor)
 No. 8, Le jongleur (D major)
 No. 9, Celui qui aime au clair de la lune. Etude du tremolo (E major)
 No. 10, Don Quichotte (C major)
 No. 11, Hamlet (E♭ minor)
 No. 12, Falstaff (D major)
 Aus Andersens Märchen (From Andersen's Fairy Tales), 12 pieces, Op. 30
 No. 1, The Princess and the Pea
 No. 2, The Bell
 No. 3, The Hardy Tin Soldier
 No. 4, The Angel
 No. 5, Little Ida's Flowers
 No. 6, The Nightingale
 No. 7, It is quite certain
 No. 8, The Child in the Grave
 No. 9, The Butterfly
 No. 10, The Ugly Duckling
 No. 11, Golden Treasure
 No. 12, The Metal Pig
10 Preludes, Op. 33
Ein Roman, 8 pieces, Op. 35
 No. 1, Begegnung (Meeting)
 No. 2, Plauderei (Conversation)
 No. 3, Erwachende Liebe (Dawning Love)
 No. 4, Auf dem Ball (In the Ballroom)
 No. 5, Enttäuschung (Depression)
 No. 6, Vorwürfe (Reproaches)
 No. 7, Ein Brief (A Letter)
 No. 8, Höchstes Glück (Supreme Happiness)
Kindheit: 14 leichte Stücke nach dem Roman von Leo Tolstoj (Childhood: 14 Light Pieces after the novel of Leo Tolstoy), Op. 39
 No. 1, Der Lehrer (The Teacher)
 No. 2, Maman (Mama)
 No. 3, Der Vater (The Father)
 No. 4, Grischa, der wandernde Mönch (Grischa, the Wandering Monk)
 No. 5, Katienka & Liubotschka, Polka
 No. 6, Kindheit (Childhood)
 No. 7, Die Amme (The Nurse)
 No. 8, Die Jagd (The Hunt)
 No. 9, Robinson-Spiele (Playing at Robinson Crusoe)
 No. 10, Vielleicht erste Liebe (Perhaps First Love)
 No. 11, Die Gäste kommen (The Guests Arrive)
 No. 12, Quadrille
 No. 13, Mazurka
 No. 14, Der Tod der Mutter (The Mother's Death)
7 Preludes, Op. 40
Ballade, Op. 42
Élégie, Op. 46
Im 3/4 Takt: Sechs Klavierstücke, Op. 48
 Marionettes, 9 pieces, Op. 54
 No. 1, Russisches Bauernmädchen (Russian Peasant Girl)
 No. 2, Der Kosak (The Cossack)
 No. 3, Spanierin (The Spanish Lady)
 No. 4, Tirolerin (The Tirolese)
 No. 5, Zigeuner (The Gipsy)
 No. 6, Marquise (The Marchioness)
 No. 7, Der Chinese (The Chinese)
 No. 8, Teddybär (Teddy Bear)
 No. 9, Kasperl-Harlekin (Punch-Harlequin)
Jugoslavische Suite, Op. 58
Lyrica Nova, 4 pieces, Op. 59
Piano Sonata No. 2 in C-sharp minor, Op. 60
Fantasiestücke, Op. 61
 No. 1, Warum?
 No. 2, Ein Traum
 No. 3, ... und das Erwachen
 No. 4, Humoreske
 No. 5, Sie tanzt
 No. 6, Serenade
 3 Mazurkas, Op. 64
 4 Klavierstücke, Op. 65
 No. 1, Chant sans paroles  (Lied ohne Worte; Song Without Words) (E major)
 No. 2, Etude (E minor)
 No. 3, Epithalame (Chant nuptile), for the left hand (Hochzeitsang; Wedding Song)  (C♯ major)
 No. 4, Capriccio alla Pollaca (C♯ minor)
Preludes, Op. 66

Piano 4-Hands
Russische Weisen und Tänze,(Russian Dance) Op. 31

Two Pianos
Russische Tänze, Op. 18

Chamber music

Violin and Piano
Violin Sonata in G minor, Op. 26
Suite for Violin and Piano, Op. 63
Berceuse for Violin and Piano

Cello and Piano
Three Pieces for Cello and Piano, Op. 25
Cello Sonata, Op. 36

Piano Trio
Piano Trio, Op. 38

Orchestral

Symphonies
Symphony No. 1 in D major “From my Homeland”, Op. 52
Symphony No. 2 in E-flat major, Op. 55

Symphonic Poems
Othello, Op. 19

Concertos
 Piano Concerto No. 1, Op. 16 (Kistner & Siegel 1913) (Dedicated to Elisabeth Bortkiewicz)
 Cello Concerto, Op. 20 (Rahter 1922)
 Violin Concerto, Op. 22 (Rahter 1923)
 Piano Concerto No. 2 for the left hand only, Op. 28 (Manuscript Rahter 1924)
 Piano Concerto No. 3, Op. 32 'Per aspera ad astra' (Rahter 1927) (Dedicated to Paul de Conne)
Des Frühlings und des Pans Erwachen - ein lyrisches intermezzo nach Gemälden von Sandro Botticelli for violin and orchestra, Op. 44 (manuscript 1934)
 Russian Rhapsody for piano and orchestra, Op. 45 (manuscript 1935)

Other
Russische Tänze for Orchestra, Op. 18
Träume, Fantasy for Orchestra, Op. 34
Österreichische Suite for String Orchestra, Op. 51
Overture for Orchestra, Op. 53
Jugoslawische Suite for Orchestra, Op. 58

Opera
Die Akrobaten, Op. 50

Ballet
Arabische Nächte, Op. 37

Lieder
Sechs Lieder, Op. 2
Sieben Gedichte von Paul Verlaine, Op. 23
Hafis Lieder, Op. 43
Russische Gedichte, Op. 47
Im Park, Op. 56
Sternflug des Herzens, Op. 62
Vier Lieder, Op. 67
Drei Lieder, Op. 69
Drei Melodramen, Op. 71
Lieder, Op. 72
Lieder, Op. 73
Lieder, Op. 74

References

External links
List of compositions (in German)
Site dedicated to Sergei Bortkiewicsz including a complete list of compositions

Bortkiewicz, Sergei